Garlica may refer to the following places in Poland:

Garlica Duchowna
Garlica Murowana